"Change Clothes" is the first official single from rapper Jay-Z's studio album The Black Album. It featured additional vocals by Pharrell Williams (uncredited) and was produced by The Neptunes. The song reached No. 10 on the Billboard Hot 100 in December, 2003.

In Danger Mouse's Grey Album remix, the cello and harpsichord arrangement from "Piggies", from the Beatles album The Beatles (more commonly known as The White Album), is mixed with this song.

Music video
The video directed by Chris Robinson features appearances from Russell Simmons, Kimora Lee Simmons, Memphis Bleek, Mary J. Blige,  Beanie Sigel, talk show host Kelly Ripa, her husband, actor Mark Consuelos, models Naomi Campbell, Jessica White, Liliana Dominguez, Jade Cole, D. Woods, singer Omahyra Mota, Will Hoar, Mey Bun and rapper Mos Def.

Track listing

CD single, Pt. 1
 "Change Clothes""
 "What More Can I Say"

CD single, Pt. 2
 "Change Clothes"
 "Excuse Me Miss"
 "I Just Wanna Luv U (Give It 2 Me)"
 "Change Clothes" (Video)

Charts

Weekly charts

Year-end charts

See also
List of songs recorded by Jay-Z

References

2003 singles
Jay-Z songs
Pharrell Williams songs
Music videos directed by Chris Robinson (director)
Song recordings produced by the Neptunes
Songs written by Pharrell Williams
Songs written by Chad Hugo
Songs written by Jay-Z